Indent may refer to:

Indent (album), a 1973 free jazz album by Cecil Taylor
indent (Unix), a computer program that formats programming language files with a particular indent style
Indent test, a test for material hardness
Indent, a special type of purchase order
 Indent agent, or buying agent, person or company that purchases goods on behalf of another party

See also
Indentation (disambiguation)